"It's You Again" is a song co-written and recorded by American country music artist Skip Ewing. It was released in October 1989 as the first single from the album The Will to Love.  The song reached number 5 on the Billboard Hot Country Singles & Tracks chart.  The song was written Ewing, Mike Geiger and Woody Mullis.

The B-side, "Ain't That the Way It Always Ends", was later covered by Tim McGraw on his 1997 album Everywhere.

Chart performance

Year-end charts

References

1989 singles
Skip Ewing songs
Songs written by Skip Ewing
Song recordings produced by Jimmy Bowen
MCA Records singles
Songs written by Mike Geiger
Songs written by Woody Mullis
1989 songs